The Church of England (Continuing) is part of the Continuing Anglican Movement. Although the church was widely discussed in Anglican circles at the time of its founding, it has not achieved significant growth since that time.

In 2019 the church held a celebration of 25 years since its foundation. It holds an annual conference at Benson, Oxfordshire.

Since 2008 the church has regularly exhibited at the Christian Resources Exhibition at Esher, Surrey and elsewhere in England. It publishes a magazine called The Journal as well as other literature and books.

Origins and doctrine
The church was founded on 10 February 1994 at a meeting chaired by David Samuel at St Mary's, Castle Street, Reading, as a reaction against the use of contemporary-language liturgies (particularly the 1980 Alternative Service Book) and the recently approved ordination of women as priests.

The church assents to the unmodified Thirty-Nine Articles of Religion of the Church of England (constitution section 1), the 1662 Book of Common Prayer for liturgy, and to the historic three-fold ministry of bishops, priests, and deacons, ordained according to the Ordinal of the 1662 Book of Common Prayer. Its doctrine is Calvinist, and it stands in the conservative evangelical protestant tradition.

The church maintains a conservative view on Christian leadership, and women are not permitted to teach at meetings or to exercise authority in the church (constitution section 3).

Congregations
The Church of England (Continuing) has one church building, St Mary's in Reading, which was the church of its founding member, David Samuel. A second group meets in Wolverhampton, in the former Long Street synagogue (built 1903). Additionally, small groups meet in a rented hall  in Wimbledon, and a community centre in Frinton-on-Sea.

These are the four congregations listed by the church as of 2020:
St Mary's Church, Castle Street, Reading, Berkshire – minister, Edward J. Malcolm 
St John's Church, Wimbledon, London, – minister, Peter Ratcliff 
St Silas' Church, Wolverhampton
Holy Trinity Church, Frinton-on-Sea – lay minister, Philip Lievesley
A previous fifth congregation, at Nuffield, has since closed.

Leadership
The church has had three presiding bishops since its foundation:
 David Samuel, 1995–2001
 Edward Malcolm, 2001–2013
 Edward J Malcolm, 2013–present

The first bishop of the church was its founder, David Samuel, who is now retired. He consecrated as his successor Edward Malcolm, minister of St Silas' Wolverhampton, who died on 17 November 2013.  The current presiding bishop is Edward J. Malcolm, minister of St Mary's, Reading, who was also consecrated by David Samuel, one week after the death of Edward Malcolm in 2013.

The bishop, Edward J Malcolm, is currently one of only three active clergymen in the church, although there are several lay readers and preachers.

The church establishes its episcopal succession from the late Albion Knight, Archbishop of the United Episcopal Church of North America, who consecrated David Samuel on 11 June 1995. The closest link of episcopal succession with the Church of England is John Moore (Archbishop of Canterbury), who consecrated William White of Pennsylvania in 1787, and from whom Knight claimed his succession.

References

External links
Official website

Christian organizations established in 1994
Continuing Anglican denominations
Christian denominations established in the 20th century
Anglicanism in the United Kingdom
Evangelical Anglicanism
Evangelicalism in the United Kingdom